
Year 108 BC was a year of the pre-Julian Roman calendar. At the time it was known as the Year of the Consulship of Galba and Hortensius/Scaurus (or, less frequently, year 646 Ab urbe condita) and the Third Year of Yuanfeng. The denomination 108 BC for this year has been used since the early medieval period, when the Anno Domini calendar era became the prevalent method in Europe for naming years.

Events 
 By place 

 Roman Republic 
 Roman forces under Quintus Caecilius Metellus Numidicus defeat the forces of Jugurtha of Numidia at the Battle of the Muthul, with Gaius Marius as a subordinate.

 Asia 
 Han conquest of Gojoseon
 The Han generals Yang Pu and Xun Zhi besiege Wangxian (Pyongyang), the capital of Gojoseon. Infighting between the generals leads Xun Zhi to arrest Yang Pu.
 Summer - After being deserted by some of his officials, king Ugeo of Gojoseon is assassinated. Cheng Yi takes over the defense of Wangxian but is killed by Han sympathizers. 
 Han subjugates Gojoseon and divides it into four prefectures. Xun Zhi is executed for infighting.
 Emperor Wu of Han founds Jiuquan in the Hexi Corridor as a military outpost on the Silk Road to Central Asia. It serves to protect diplomats and merchants, and it cuts off the kings of the region from the Xiongnu. He also founds Xianlei in present-day Inner Mongolia, extending Han control further north than before.

Births 
 Lucius Sergius Catilina, Roman politician (d. 62 BC)

Deaths 
 Marcus Livius Drusus (the Elder), Roman consul 
 Ugeo of Gojoseon, king of Wiman Joseon (Korea)

References